The Battle of Sultanabad occurred on February 13, 1812 between the Russian Empire and the Persian Empire. In the resulting battle, the Russians were routed.

The Persians, numerically superior, were led by Abbas Mirza and fought the Russians, led by Pyotr Kotlyarevsky. A Persian offensive into Georgia, with its British and French-trained Nezam-e Jadid infantry, initiated the battle. The Persians had also obtained European cannons from the French.

The Persians won the battle by moving faster than the Russians and by attacking them near their camp. Although it was a minor victory for the Persians, Abbas Mirza tried to act as if it were a major victory.

In the end, however, the Persians lost the invasion because of the Russian maneuvering around the Aras River which culminated in the Battle of Aslanduz. The Persians would have given up had it not been for the news of Napoleon's invasion of Russia in the spring.

See also
 Battle of Aslanduz
 Siege of Lankaran

References

Bibliography
 Roxane Farmanfarmiaian (editor). (2008) War and Peace in Qajar Persia: Implications Past and Present. Routledge. 
 Journal of the British Institute of Persian Studies, Volume 36, Tehran   Author, Article Title, page numbers needed
 Atkin, Muriel. (1980). Russia and Iran, 1780 - 1828. Minneapolis: University of Minnesota Press. 
 Kazemzadeh, Firuz. (1974). Russian Penetration of the Caucasus. In Russian Imperialism: From Ivan the Great to the Revolution, ed. Taras Hunczak. New Brunswick, NJ: Rutgers University Press. 

Battles involving Russia
Battles involving Qajar Iran
Conflicts in 1812
19th century in Azerbaijan
1812 in the Russian Empire
Battles of the Russo-Persian Wars
1812 in Iran
February 1812 events